Abdurrahiman Bafaqi Thangal (1905—1973), honorific Sayyid, title Ba Faqih, was an Indian community leader and politician from Kerala. Until his death in the early 1970s, Bafaqi Thangal remained the most prominent Muslim political leader in Kerala. He is generally credited with transforming the perception of Indian Union Muslim League inside Kerala. 

Abdurrahiman Bafaqi Thangal belonged to a sayyid family of jurists (the "Ba Faqih") in north Kerala. The Yemeni-origin family was settled in Kerala in the early 18th century. The Bafaqi Thangals were also a prominent business family of the city of Calicut (by being international rice dealers). 

Bafaqi Thangal was born to Abdul Qadir Bafaqi Thangal and Fathima Mulla Beevi on 19 February 1906 at Koyilandy. After the studies at Ponnani, he moved to the lucrative export business at Calicut, became a powerful Calicut businessman and eventually established the Bafaqi and Company at Yangon, Myanmar.

Bafaqi Thangal entered active politics in 1936 as a campaigner against an All-India Muslim League candidate from Kozhikode-Kurumbranad Constituency. He subsequently joined the League (1938), and rapidly rose to become the President of the Malabar Muslim League.  He also helped to persuade Panakkad Pukkoya Thangal, a sayyid community leader from South Malabar, to join the League. When Kerala State was formed in 1956, he was chosen as the President of the Kerala State Muslim League. 

Bafaqi Thangal also served as the leader of the Samastha Kerala Jamiyyat al-Ulama. He is remembered for his organisation of the sector of madarasa education (institutions where children receive basic Islamic education) in Kerala.

Bafaqi Thangal is generally credited for

 Transforming the perception Indian Union Muslim League inside Kerala.
 Representing all the differences within the large Kerala Muslim community.
Forming an alliance with the P. S. P. in the 1957 assembly elections.
Joining the Liberation Struggle against the Communist government.
Successfully negotiating with the Congress (1959-60) and the Left (1967 and 1969) leadership for the Muslim League.

Bafaqi Thangal died in 1973 (while on the pilgrimage to the holy city of Mecca) and was interred in Mecca.

Family 
Bafaqi Thangal had married five times.

 Tanur Puthan Veetil Khadeeja Beevi  
 Koilandy Shareefa Amina Beevi
 Koilandy Puthiya Maliykkal Muthu Beevi
 Chaliyam Khadeeja Beevi  
 Puthiyangadi Shareefa Beevi

External links 
 Sayyid Muhammedali Shihab Thangal on Sayyid Abdurrahiman  Bafaqi Thangal
 A. K. Antony on Sayyid Abdurrahiman Bafaqi Thangal

References  

1900s births
1973 deaths
Indian Union Muslim League politicians
People from Kozhikode district